Arthur Steven Lange Jr. (born October 11, 1967) is an American stand-up comedian, actor, and radio personality best known for his tenures on the sketch comedy series Mad TV from 1995 to 1997 and The Howard Stern Show from 2001 to 2009. Raised in New Jersey, Lange first worked as a longshoreman and taxi driver to help support his family, following the death of his quadriplegic father. He debuted as a stand-up comic in 1987 and took up the profession full-time five years later, developing his act on the New York City club circuit.

In 1995, Lange moved to Los Angeles to star in Mad TV. His arrest for cocaine possession during the second season led to his departure and subsequent rehabilitation. In 1997, Norm Macdonald chose Lange to co-star in his comedy film Dirty Work (1998), which secured Lange further acting roles including Macdonald's sitcom The Norm Show. In 2001, Lange returned to New Jersey and joined The Howard Stern Show and pursued various projects during this time; he released two comedy albums, co-wrote, produced, and starred in his feature film Artie Lange's Beer League (2006), and released his first book, Too Fat to Fish (2008), which entered The New York Times Best Seller list at number one.

After attempting suicide in early 2010, Lange completed rehabilitation and hosted The Nick & Artie Show with Nick Di Paolo from 2011 to 2013, after which Lange hosted The Artie Lange Show until 2014. During this time, Lange released his second book, Crash and Burn (2013). From 2015 to 2017, Lange hosted The Artie Quitter Podcast which was followed by a recurring role in the HBO series Crashing and a stint as co-host of The Artie and Anthony Show with Anthony Cumia until 2018. That year, he released his third book Wanna Bet? and put a hiatus on his career following a series of arrests and drug rehabilitation. After becoming sober, Lange resumed stand-up and launched Artie Lange's Halfway House podcast in 2019, but paused his career twice before resuming the podcast in October 2021.

Early life 
Lange was born on October 11, 1967, in Livingston, New Jersey, and was raised in Union Township, Union County. His mother, Judy (née Caprio), of Italian descent, was a housewife, while his father, Arthur Lange Sr., of German descent, was a general contractor who installed television antennas. His sister Stacey is a fashion designer. Two weeks after Lange's birth, his father went on trial for keeping $200,000 in counterfeit money for a loan shark, but was spared jail time out of the court's sympathy for his young son. In August 2003, Lange found out he is approximately twenty-five percent American Indian after submitting a sample of his DNA for testing.

Lange attended Union High School, during which he played baseball and became an all-county third baseman. His poor grades required him to attend summer school in order to graduate. In August 1985, Lange was arrested for attempted bank robbery. He claimed he was trying to impress his girlfriend at the time, by passing the teller a note that said he was armed and demanded $50,000. Once he saw that the teller took it seriously, he frantically threw the note in a nearby trash can and told the teller it was all a joke. However, the teller triggered the silent alarm. His charge was reduced to disorderly conduct which required Lange to pay $500 in court fees and complete 25 hours of community service in March 1986. As part of his probation, Lange attended the Connecticut School of Broadcasting from March to June 1987.

In 1985, Lange gained admission to Seton Hall University in New Jersey using a connection his uncle had with an employee of the admissions department. In one early assignment, he received an A grade for a presentation he made, telling stories about his friends and family to the class. "It was the first time I got a bunch of laughs in front of a crowd of total strangers and it felt amazing to get that reaction from people." After four weeks, however, Lange had become bored of studying and began to think of ways to quit. On October 18, his father fell off a ladder while installing an antenna and broke his back, becoming a quadriplegic. 

Money soon became an issue in the family; Lange spent a short time installing antennas and his mother became a secretary. Lange recalled: "We took out a second mortgage. Medicaid paid for a nurse eight hours a day. When my mother got back from being a secretary all day, she had to take care of him. Every night, she set her alarm clock to turn him so he wouldn't get bedsores." In 1987, the family contacted celebrities asking them to donate items for auction. Howard Stern, the only one to respond, sent them an autographed jacket and said on the air, "Does this guy think that if he puts the jacket on he's going to walk again?", which Lange and his father both reportedly found funny. Lange's father died from complications of an infection in 1990, although Lange has expressed the opinion that one of his father's "crazy friends" may have helped him to commit suicide.

Career

1987–1995: Early career 
Lange cites Richard Pryor, Richard Lewis, and George Carlin as early influences. On July 12, 1987, at age nineteen, Lange performed his first stand-up comedy routine at The Improv in Hell's Kitchen, Manhattan. He recalled, "I bombed for five minutes. Everyone thinks that they can do better. I was unprepared, I mumbled, and I forgot stuff. But I'm proud that I did it." Lange would not attempt stand-up again for another four years. 

In 1988, Lange took acting classes for three weeks from Sandy Dennis at HB Studio in New Jersey; he quit after he could no longer afford them. In February 1991, Lange supported his family by taking up work as a longshoreman at Port Newark, loading ships at its orange juice pier. That year, Lange earned around $60,000. In September 1992, Lange quit his longshoreman job to focus on a comedy career, giving himself one year to make it at stand-up comedy. During his search for work, he found regular employment driving a taxi in New York City. The flexibility of his taxi job allowed him to perform sets at the clubs and resume work afterwards. Lange's first paid gig as a stand-up comedian followed at the United States Merchant Marine Academy in Kings Point, New York, for a payment of $30. He then became a paid regular for the first time in 1992 at Stand Up NY in Manhattan, followed by Comic Strip Live, where he would perform a 20-minute set from Tuesday to Saturday nights.

Within a year of starting, Lange landed a role in a dinner theater play, touring restaurants and catering halls across New Jersey. He then co-formed an improv troupe called Live on Tape which sold out Caroline's on Broadway numerous times. The success of these shows led to a contract with the William Morris Agency where Lange met Peter Principato, his manager for the next ten years. Lange took up extra work with roles in commercials which were a "big step up", including a voiceover for Foot Locker, which entitled him to become a member of AFTRA. During this time, Lange developed an addiction to cocaine and alcohol.

1995–1997: Mad TV, first suicide attempt, and jail time
At age twenty-seven, Lange was selected as one of the eight cast members in the sketch comedy series Mad TV, from the eight thousand that were screened. He flew to Los Angeles in May 1995 to shoot the television pilot which was picked up by the Fox network. Lange moved to Los Angeles two months later to film the first season. The show paid him a large signing bonus plus a salary of $7,500 per episode, fueling his worsening  cocaine habit; during this period he said he was using cocaine "like it was going out of style".

In November 1995, after nine episodes had been shot, he attempted suicide after he ran out of cocaine, drank whiskey and "a bunch of pills", and wrote a suicide note to his mother and sister. He claimed, "I was 100 percent serious about dying". He was found by his Mad TV co-stars and taken to intensive care. Lange returned to New Jersey to complete a rehabilitation and counselling program. At its conclusion, he wrote a new forty-five minute stand-up set that he felt "really proud of", and used his Mad TV fame to headline spots in comedy clubs around New York City, supported by further voiceover work for commercials.

In January 1996, Lange returned to Los Angeles to film the remaining episodes of the first season. Quincy Jones, the show's producer, supported Lange during rehab and sent him over on his private jet. Lange returned to form in his work, ranking his performance in these episodes as "the best I've ever done in sketch comedy", including the creation of his hit character, White Mama. In the summer of 1996, Lange secured his first major acting role for an independent film titled Puppet, starring Rebecca Gayheart and Fred Weller. He wrote, "To this day I have never seen it because I don't think it's possible to purchase a copy of it anywhere ... it was screened in a theater at least once, because my manager went to see it".

Filming for the second season of Mad TV began in August 1996. Two months later, Lange ended his sobriety and returned to using cocaine. His time on the show ended in November 1996 when his agent and the show's cast and crew attempted an intervention. The incident began when Lange lost a $15,000 bet on the Mike Tyson vs. Evander Holyfield boxing match and turned up to rehearsals "coked up". Lange fled the set, running through streets with his co-workers chasing him. It ended in the parking lot of a supermarket where Lange was arrested and served a short time in Los Angeles County Jail. The case was never tried in court. While in jail, Lange received a voice mail from Cameron Crowe who informed him that his scene with Tom Cruise and Kelly Preston for Jerry Maguire had been cut.

After his jail term, Lange returned to New Jersey in January 1997 and spent a short time in a psychiatric hospital. He described this time as the "most depressing period" of his life. He returned home afterwards, and fell into a clinical depression. After the producers at Mad TV convinced Lange to complete formal rehabilitation, he spent two months at Honesty House in Stirling, New Jersey. Lange's contract was not renewed for the show's third season, but he made special guest appearances on the fifth, tenth, and fourteenth seasons.

1997–2001: Dirty Work and The Norm Show 
In 1997, Lange left rehab and resumed stand-up gigs in New York City. His depression improved soon after when he was invited to audition for two network television sitcoms, which boosted his confidence "astronomically". During the negotiations phase, Lange was contacted by comedian and actor Norm Macdonald, who asked him to audition for the dual lead role in his comedy buddy film Dirty Work (1998), directed by Bob Saget.

Macdonald had not found a suitable actor for the part until he happened to tune into an episode of Mad TV for the first time. He saw a sketch that involved Lange delivering an out-of-character monologue which he found funny and noted Lange "had a melancholy about him" that reminded Macdonald of comedian John Belushi. Macdonald recalled Lange's first reading of the script as "perfect", which landed him the role, but in order to shoot the film, MGM studios required Lange to obtain an approval report from his rehab facility in New Jersey. Lange settled the matter by paying the center $1,500 as a private donor.

He stopped his cocaine use on June 14, 1997, saying he "got tired of it. I got to a point where this is killing me". Filming took place across two months in Toronto. To promote the film, Lange made his debut guest appearance on The Howard Stern Show with Macdonald on January 8, 1998. The pair returned once more that year, and twice more in 1999.

Lange credits Macdonald and Saget with rejuvenating his career when his exposure from Dirty Work led to several film and television offers. When filming wrapped, various heads of networks and production companies expressed an interest in potentially hiring Lange. After meeting with them, including Warren Littlefield of NBC and Peter Roth of Fox, a bidding war occurred, with offers coming in from every major network. With help from William Morris Agency, Lange accepted a $750,000 development deal with Fox that originally stood at $250,000 in late 1997, enabling him "to bail my mother out of every single financial debt she had."

None of Lange's ideas for a show were picked up, but he supported himself by performing at comedy clubs in Los Angeles. He also landed a role in a pilot television series which he co-wrote with Sam Cass, in April 1998, subsequently re-written by request from the network. Its title was The King of New York which included Luis Guzmán in its cast. Lange felt the idea was ignored and suddenly pushed through for shooting at the last minute, which affected its quality. Weeks later, Lange accepted a second development deal, this time with NBC worth $350,000. From 1999 to 2000, Lange secured roles in the feature films Mystery Men, The Bachelor, The 4th Floor, and Lost & Found. He also toured as the opening act to Macdonald's stand-up shows.

In 1999, Lange joined the cast of Macdonald's sitcom The Norm Show during its second season as Macdonald's half brother, Artie. Lange stayed with the show until its cancellation in 2001 after three seasons. He enjoyed a period of wealth during this time, being paid $35,000 per episode for a show with "ridiculously lame, easy jokes", liked working with his castmates and lived in a $4,000-a-month condo in Beverly Hills. "Even with that life", Lange added, "creatively I was empty inside". During a 2014 interview with Marc Maron, Lange said that this creative frustration drove him to perform more stand-up comedy as he "came into his own as a comedian" by introducing more "dark," edgy material into his act.

2001–2008: The Howard Stern Show and Artie Lange's Beer League 
In March 2001, comedian and writer Jackie Martling left The Howard Stern Show. Stern announced a "Win Jackie's Money" contest and had several comedians audition for the vacant seat by sitting in on some shows. Participants included Lange, Craig Gass, Doug Stanhope, Richard Jeni, Jeff Ross, and Jim Florentine. Lange was introduced to the show in 1982 by his father, and since became a big fan. He spoke about his invitation to take part in the contest: "There were a lot of great funny guys — guys that were funnier than me ... I remember saying to my manager, 'I am not the most talented guy in this group, but I guarantee that I'm the biggest fan'". After The Norm Show ended in April 2001, Lange returned to New Jersey and sat in on several shows between May and October 2001. Lange thought he blew his chance early on after he learned the jokes he was writing for Stern were not working out. "Instead they said, 'We're just gonna keep your mic on all the time ... if you say something funny, just say it as you." Lange built a rapport with Stern, the show's staff, and the audience. One news reporter credited Lange's "everyman demeanor ... relatable to the average Joe"; another wrote: "a kind of comic Everyman, the person who says what the listener at home might be thinking". Lange was prepared to return to Los Angeles if he did not land the job, but he accepted a contract to join the show full-time which began from October 29, 2001, describing the offer as a "blessing".

In the following years after joining The Howard Stern Show, Lange's career reached new heights, playing larger venues and various career film and television opportunities. In June 2002, he signed with the United Talent Agency. Around this time, Lange teamed with producer and writer Sam Simon for a comedy show pilot for DreamWorks to air on NBC, but it never materialised. In September 2003, Lange scored a one-year talent holding deal with ABC and Touchstone Television. When Stern announced his departure from terrestrial radio for Sirius Satellite Radio in late 2004, Infinity Broadcasting offered Lange a four-year deal worth $20 million to replace Stern on WXRK-FM, with producer Gary Dell'Abate as producer. Both turned down the offer.

On December 13, 2004, Lange released his first stand-up DVD titled It's the Whiskey Talkin, formed of 45 minutes of material he performed at the Tempe Improv in Tempe, Arizona, a time in his career when he was "playing more clubs". Lange later spoke about the release: "I worked really hard on that ... a major distributor put it out, people bought it and seemed to like it". Upon the DVD's general release in February 2005, Lange took on "an insane schedule" for the following six months to promote it, doing The Howard Stern Show each weekday morning, and stand up gigs nationwide on weekends.

In March 2005, Lange secured a deal with Ckrush Entertainment to star in and executive produce his own comedy feature film, Artie Lange's Beer League. Development began in 2001 when Lange started on a script with director and producer Frank Sebastiano, based on a 17-minute film Lange wrote, funded and starred in 2000 titled Game Day. The script was complete by 2002, and Ckrush agreed to fund a $2.5 million budget. The stress of putting the film together, and doing nationwide gigs on weekends, caused Lange to drink heavily and take "twenty painkillers a day". His attempts to cope from withdrawals failed - during one attempt to obtain more at a comedy gig, he instead bought heroin which began an addiction that lasted from March to June 2005, resulting in his absence from cast auditions and pre-production meetings. Lange took four days off work in June 2005 to get through the illness caused by withdrawals at home, which prompted concerns from his family and radio colleagues of a drug relapse. When Sebastiano and production staff threatened to cancel the film if he did not show up, Lange obtained Subutex from a doctor that got him well enough to return to work. On the air, Lange put his absence down to illness from excessive drinking. Filming was completed in July 2005, on time and within budget. The film premiered on September 13, 2006, at the Ziegfeld Theatre, followed by a limited release across North America. To promote the film, Lange completed a stand-up tour which included a show at Carnegie Hall which sold out in under three hours. He revealed the true reason for his absence to Stern on September 21, 2006.

2008–2009: Various projects and Stern Show departure 
In June 2008, Lange headlined a comedy tour he formed, named Operation Mirth, with the United Service Organizations to entertain American troops serving in Afghanistan. He was inspired to do so after watching Patriot Act: A Jeffrey Ross Home Movie, a documentary about comedian Jeffrey Ross' own USO tour in Iraq. Lange picked comedians Jim Florentine, Nick DiPaolo, and Dave Attell to join him, with The Howard Stern Show's producer Gary Dell'Abate as the tour's master of ceremonies. Later in the year, Lange and Attell recorded dialogue for the video game Leisure Suit Larry: Box Office Bust, released in 2009.

In August 2008, Lange entered rehab after he cancelled his appearance on the Comedy Central Roast of Bob Saget. He had relapsed in heroin use in the previous seven weeks after he was offered it while drunk at a pool hall. Comedy Central was willing to cover the $65,000 in costs to send an ambulance for him to the airport and fly him to Los Angeles on a private jet with a doctor, but Lange declined and began treatment with a therapist recommended by comedian Richard Lewis, who contacted Lange to help.

In 2008, Lange signed a deal with Spiegel & Grau to write his first book Too Fat to Fish, a collection of memoirs across his life co-written by Anthony Bozza that "range from funny to dark, to tragic, to sad." Lange dedicated the book to Stern who wrote its foreword. Upon its release on November 11, 2008, Too Fat to Fish entered The New York Times Best Seller list at number one and held the position for one week. The book remained on the list's top ten for eleven weeks. It was referenced twice on the Top Ten List segment on Late Show with David Letterman. A paperback edition released in 2009 with an additional chapter, peaked at number six on the Best Seller paperback list.

By 2009, Lange was earning $700,000 a year for working with Stern and roughly $3 million a year from stand up gigs. In January 2009, Lange went to West Palm Beach, Florida, to complete a 21-day rehab program after he had relapsed on heroin the month prior. After seven days, he quit treatment and spent almost $4,800 on a hotel room, women, a haircut, and two pairs of sunglasses. He returned home and booked three nights at Caroline's comedy club in the same week, earning $35,000 back.

Lange relapsed on heroin once more in April 2009. To help him cope with withdrawals, Lange hired two former New York City police officers for support in his recovery and lost 50 pounds in the following six months. He later revealed a $200,000 offer to appear on Celebrity Rehab with Dr. Drew that he had declined.

On June 15, 2009, Lange made a controversial appearance on the first episode of Joe Buck Live, exchanging insults with host Joe Buck that HBO Sports president Ross Greenburg said "bordered on bad taste" with a "mean-spirited" tone. The show was cancelled two episodes later. Buck defended Lange's comments and wrote the foreword to his second book.

In July 2009, Lange was charged of driving under the influence of an intoxicant and careless driving after he became involved in a minor traffic accident in New Jersey. In October 2009, Lange took one week off from The Howard Stern Show, citing depression and a "mini nervous breakdown". His second stand up DVD and CD, Jack and Coke, was released a month later. Lange recorded the set at Gotham Comedy Club in New York City earlier in the year, and is composed of material that Lange had written over the past four years of his career, some of which dated back to 15 years, which Lange developed further and felt it was suitable to put on a recording. Jack and Coke reached number one on the iTunes Comedy Albums chart and entered its Top 20 Albums chart. It was also released as a DVD, which Comedy Central aired as a special in January 2010.

In November 2009, Lange cancelled his stand-up gigs booked for the rest of the year and throughout 2010. He felt "really beat" from work and needed time to recover from his heroin relapse that April, write new stand-up material, and work on a second book, which he had begun writing under the working title College Is for Losers. In an interview around this time Lange said, "The combination of the road and morning radio hasn't killed me, but it's come close. If I keep doing it, it will".

The situation culminated on December 9, 2009, when Lange showed up at The Howard Stern Show having spent the previous seven hours drinking whiskey and taking painkillers, which affected his performance on the air. During a commercial break, Sirius management told Lange to go home; he was granted time off from the show. He voluntarily checked in at a rehab facility on Long Island to cope with withdrawals, but he "hated everything about it", and left eight days later, on December 23. Upon his return home, Lange spent the next several days in his apartment on an alcohol and pill binge.

2010–2014: Second suicide attempt, radio show, and second book 
On January 2, 2010, Lange attempted suicide for the second time at his home by drinking bleach, slitting his wrists, and stabbing himself in the abdomen nine times with a 13-inch kitchen knife. He was found on the floor by his mother who, unbeknownst to him, was outside planning an intervention for him with his sister, two uncles, and comedian Colin Quinn. Lange was taken to a hospital for surgery, and was transferred to a psychiatric ward a week later. An executive for SiriusXM stated that Lange would be welcomed back onto The Howard Stern Show following his recovery, but Stern later decided against it, thinking it would not aid in his recovery.

Lange entered a period of depression, spending most of his time at home. On September 27, 2010, eight months after the incident, Lange performed his first stand-up routine as a surprise guest at the Comedy Cellar in New York City to a positive reception. The death of his friend and fellow comedian Greg Giraldo from a prescription drug overdose two days later sent Lange back into a depression, at a time when he considered a "return to society". In April 2011, after showing no signs of improvement, Lange was forced into a detox facility in New Jersey by Quinn and "two huge Irish guys". Lange wrote, "It was an abduction, which was exactly what I needed ... they dragged me, literally kicking and screaming".

After three weeks at the facility, Lange was transferred to Ambrosia Treatment Center in Florida for two and a half months, where he completed the program. Bruce Springsteen, one of Lange's favorite artists, contacted him during the process for support. Lange has since had "four or five" relapses between painkillers following an injury, alcohol and gambling, and continues to smoke. Initially, he denied the incident was a suicide attempt as he felt embarrassed to say it was his second, but while writing about the event and subsequent therapy, he realized, "I need to be honest with myself."

In July 2011, Lange had recovered enough to resume his career. His first endeavor took place on July 6 as co-host on a one-off radio show on Fox Sports Radio with comedian Nick Di Paolo as a stand-in for Tony Bruno. The show turned out to be a test show after Di Paolo accepted a deal to host a late-night sports comedy program on DirecTV, and chose Lange as his co-host. On October 3, 2011, The Nick & Artie Show launched on approximately 30 stations nationwide and on SiriusXM. After Di Paolo left the show in January 2013, the show was renamed The Artie Lange Show and Lange hired retired American football player Jon Ritchie as his co-host. On April 28, 2014, Lange announced the show would no longer air after that day.

In 2013, Lange accepted an $800,000 advance from Touchstone Books to write his second book. Lange agreed to the project primarily for the money, but also wished to put out something that would help others who struggle with drug abuse. He wrote the book, Crash and Burn, with Bozza returning as his co-author, which covers his life and career during his final years on The Howard Stern Show, his second suicide attempt and resulting depression, and his recovery. Lange described the book as "the most honest thing I've ever done in my life". Following its release on October 29, 2013, the book entered The New York Times Best Seller list at number 8 under combined print and e-book sales and number 12 under hardcover sales.

2014–2019: The Artie Quitter Podcast, third book, and Crashing 
Following the cancellation of his DirecTV show, Lange focused on his comedy career. He recorded a one-hour special for Comedy Central titled The Stench of Failure that aired on October 18, 2014. On November 4, 2014, Lange sent out a series of tweets about a sexual fantasy between him and ESPN sportscaster Cari Champion set during slavery times. He was Thomas Jefferson and Champion was a slave, and he attempts to whip her but fails. She beats him up and escapes. As a result, Lange received a lifetime ban from ESPN and Comedy Central cancelled a scheduled appearance.

On January 5, 2015, Lange launched an uncensored subscription-based podcast titled The Artie Quitter Podcast. He recorded episodes mainly from his home in Hoboken, New Jersey. Lange estimated the podcast gained "about 9,000" subscribers in its first year. In May 2017, Lange stated the podcast would end after 400 episodes in order to tend to his comedy, filming Crashing, and his third book. He aimed to resume the podcast around September 2017, either at a cheaper subscription rate or free with advertisements.

In 2015, Lange made a return to television after he secured roles on two shows. He made two guest appearances on The Jim Gaffigan Show in 2015 and 2016, respectively, and was chosen to star in a pilot episode for a new HBO comedy series titled Crashing, starring Pete Holmes with producer and editor Judd Apatow. After the series was picked up, filming began in November 2015 with Lange in a recurring role playing a loose version of himself. The remaining episodes were shot through 2016, and the title of the first is "Artie Lange". Lange revealed he was paid $15,000 per episode. During this time, Lange recorded a scene for a special reunion episode of Mad TV. Crashing premiered in February 2017; to help promote it, Lange completed a stand-up and media tour with Holmes and Apatow. He revealed his salary of $17,500 per episode on season two.

In December 2015, Lange started on his third book with Bozza. Their publisher required the pair to produce a 25-page proposal for it before a contract was offered; they wrote one titled The Gambler: A Degenerate's Guide to Living on the Edge. The piece was well received and a deal with the publisher was made. Wanna Bet?: A Degenerate Gambler's Guide to Living on the Edge was released in July 2018.

On September 5, 2017, Lange co-hosted his new show, The Artie and Anthony Show, with Anthony Cumia on the latter's online subscription-based network Compound Media. Cumia had hosted The Anthony Cumia Show for three years by himself until he decided to bring in a co-host. Lange was absent from the show for six weeks following his December 2017 arrest and subsequent time in rehab; he returned full-time on January 22, 2018. Cumia announced Lange's departure on May 14, 2018, for the foreseeable future due to his ongoing health and legal issues.

In 2018, Lange's potential projects included the development of a film, a sitcom, and an animated series.

Arrests, return to jail, and rehabilitation
On March 12, 2017, Lange was arrested on three charges for possession of heroin, cocaine and drug paraphernalia in his car and on himself, in the parking garage of his apartment complex. He was released on a summons with a set court appearance. Three days prior to his arrest, Apatow and HBO offered Lange a buddy comedy-type show and a raise in salary, but Lange claimed he was fired from the second season of Crashing in the wake of the incident. However, Apatow maintained this was not the case and Lange revealed he is "still a Crashing employee".

On April 5, 2017, Lange's original charges were downgraded to three "disorderly persons" offenses, equivalent to misdemeanors, as he was not in the car where the drugs were found. Lange failed to appear in court due to miscommunication from his lawyer, resulting in a bench warrant issued by the court. The situation culminated in Lange's arrest on December 12 when he failed to appear in court in response to an additional arrest on May 12 when he was caught at high speed with a bag of heroin on his lap.

On July 7, 2017, Lange was rushed to a hospital and had emergency surgery on his chest after he collapsed after performing stand-up in Chicago, and claimed he was hours from death.

On December 15, 2017, Lange pleaded guilty to possessing 81 bags of heroin in exchange for the earlier charge of possession of cocaine being dropped. He then checked himself into rehab on a private jet paid for by two fellow comics. Lange left rehab in January 2018, and began an outpatient rehab program for five days a week with regular urine tests. He reasoned his drug relapse down to anger. On June 1, 2018, Lange was sentenced to four years of probation with orders to complete 50 hours of community service and complete further outpatient rehabilitation.

In November 2018, Lange announced his decision to enter inpatient rehabilitation with comedian Bob Levy, after breaking his four-year probation by testing positive twice for cocaine and opioids. On several occasions he left rehab to perform stand-up comedy gigs before returning to the facility on the same night. On January 30, 2019, Lange was placed into custody for possession of a controlled substance and checked into a treatment center. In April 2019, comedian Russ Meneve filmed Lange carrying out court-ordered community work as a trash collector and posted it online.

A month later, Lange posted a tweet which revealed he had moved on to work at a gas station. On May 21, Lange was arrested on a drug court warrant for violating the conditions of his probation program. On June 10, after 21 days in jail, he was released and began a new in-patient program. Radar Online reported in August 2019 that Lange was progressing in rehab and would remain at least through September. He was scheduled to return to a New Jersey court where a jail sentence was a possibility. On September 10, 2019, Lange left rehab and announced that had been sober for more than seven months. On January 30, 2020, Lange announced that he had been sober for one year.

2019–present: Resuming career and Halfway House podcast
After being released from rehab, Lange performed his first stand-up routine that night at the Comedy Cellar in New York City. He then resumed regular stand-up gigs in the local area. He announced that he had written a fourth memoir while in rehab, tentatively named Rippin' & Runnin': Life on Drug Court.

On September 20, 2019, Lange announced that he had signed a deal to start a new podcast. Artie Lange's Halfway House premiered on December 2, 2019, featuring comedian Mike Bocchetti as co-host. The last episode was released on February 7, 2020, before Lange put his career on hold later that month. He later said that he had returned to the public eye too soon and needed further time to work on his recovery program. Lange resurfaced in November 2020 with a new podcast series, Letters to Artie, on The Comics Gym network with his manager as co-host. The pair recorded one episode, after which Lange entered another career hiatus. 

In October 2021, Lange resumed the Artie Lange's Halfway House podcast, recording two episodes a week. He also set up a Patreon account. In February 2022, Lange put the podcast on hiatus once more to focus on his health.

Personal life 
From 2002 to 2006, Lange was in a relationship with Dana Cironi. He met his future fiancée Adrienne Ockrymiek in 2009 at a tanning salon; they broke up in 2014.

Since 2001, Lange has lived in a penthouse in Hoboken, New Jersey, which he bought for $620,000. In 2008, he bought a 7,000 square-foot summer home in Toms River, New Jersey, for $2.5 million with one of the rooms renovated by the Man Caves television crew. He put the home on the market in 2010; it was sold in 2016.

Lange does not consider himself a liberal, though he is pro-choice, a supporter of gay rights, and a supporter of unions owing to his former career as a longshoreman. during an episode of his Artie the Quitter podcast. In 2016 he stated correctly that as a convicted felon, he cannot vote, however as of 2019 this is no longer the case in New Jersey.

In 2007, the New York City bakery Crumbs began to sell a vanilla and chocolate cupcake named Artie Lange which he designed himself, with proceeds going towards LIFEbeat, a HIV/AIDS charity. In March 2008, LIFEbeat refused to accept further donations after Lange used a variety of anti-gay epithets towards a co-worker with whom he was arguing on-air, although they later reached an amicable truce. In 2013, he said he felt "ashamed and embarrassed" by his previous use of anti-gay slurs in his comedy career and, while maintaining that he was never motivated by hatred and that he "still makes jokes about every group of people that there is", he is now more responsible when joking about such sensitive subjects and avoids slurs, saying "if someone came to me and told me that something I said caused some kid to commit suicide, I'd be in a nuthouse for the rest of my life, I really would."

In the early 2010s, Lange was diagnosed with diabetes and requires daily insulin injections.

Filmography

Stand up comedy

Television

Feature films

Radio

Bibliography

References
 Citations

 Bibliography

External links

 
 

1967 births
Living people
20th-century American comedians
21st-century American comedians
American agnostics
American male comedians
American male film actors
American radio personalities
American stand-up comedians
American male television actors
American television personalities
American television writers
American male television writers
American people convicted of drug offenses
American people of German descent
American people of Italian descent
American podcasters
American sketch comedians
Male actors from New Jersey
People from Livingston, New Jersey
People from Union Township, Union County, New Jersey
Seton Hall University alumni
Shock jocks
Comedians from New Jersey
Union High School (New Jersey) alumni
Howard Stern